The 2001 Samsung Four Nations Tournament was the third and the final edition of the Four Nations Tournament which was held from 3 to 5 August 2001 in Shanghai, China. The tournament was planned to host by the Chinese Football Association and International Sport and Leisure (ISL). However, after the bankrupt of the ISL, the Chinese Football Association took over the whole tournament.

Participants 
North Korea, Kuwait, Trinidad and Tobago, Costa Rica, Ukraine, Belarus and Turkmenistan were invited to the tournament. On 26 June 2001, the participants were announced.

  (host)

Venues

Matches 
All times are local, CST (UTC+8).

Bracket

Semi-finals

Third-place playoff

Final

Statistics

Goalscorers

References 

Four Nations Tournament (China)
2001 in association football
Sports competitions in Shanghai
2001 in Chinese football
August 2001 sports events in Asia
International association football competitions hosted by China